Gilles Müller was the defending champion, but lost in the quarterfinals to Benoît Paire.

Daniil Medvedev won his first ATP title, defeating Alex de Minaur in the final, 1–6, 6–4, 7–5.

Seeds
The top four seeds receive a bye into the second round.

Draw

Finals

Top half

Bottom half

Qualifying

Seeds

Qualifiers

Lucky loser

Qualifying draw

First qualifier

Second qualifier

Third qualifier

Fourth qualifier

Notes

References
 Main Draw
 Qualifying Draw

Men's Singles